Richard Justice (by 1488 – 1548/49), of Reading, Berkshire, was an English politician. He was Mayor of Reading in 1539-40 and 1543–4. He was a Member (MP) of the Parliament of England for Reading in 1542.

References

15th-century births
1540s deaths
English MPs 1542–1544
People from Reading, Berkshire